Onderstepoort is situated in Pretoria, Gauteng, South Africa.

Onderstepoort Veterinary Institute and the University of Pretoria Faculty of Veterinary Science, founded by Sir Arnold Theiler, is also situated here. The institute is known for tropical disease research, and the veterinary faculty has strong ties with the Royal College of Veterinary Science in the United Kingdom.

References

External links 
 Agricultural Research Council
 University of Pretoria Faculty of Veterinary Science

Populated places in the City of Tshwane
University of Pretoria campus